The Modern Hungary Movement, abbreviated to MoMa, was a liberal conservative political party in Hungary. Founded by former Finance Minister Lajos Bokros MEP on 21 April 2013, MoMa stood for free market, liberal values and champions "individual freedom, the free market, and the freedom of private and intellectual property".

The party claimed to be modelled on the Conservative Party in the United Kingdom.

History
MoMa decided not to participate in the 2014 parliamentary election, because "they do not want to weaken the cooperation of left-wing parties with separate candidates." Bokros criticized and resented that his party were excluded from the alliance. Later MoMa formally asked its supporters to vote Unity in the 2014 general election, after receiving constitutional guarantees from the left-wing opposition.

The party planned to run in the 2014 European Parliament election, however its registration was refused by the National Election Office (NVI). As a result Bokros lost his European Parliament mandate. Bokros also ran for Mayor of Budapest in the 2014 municipal election. On 29 September 2014, two other candidates, the independent György Magyar and candidate of the leftist opposition parties' Ferenc Falus withdrew from the election and supported Bokros. Bokros received 36.04% of the vote and came second after István Tarlós. He was supported by  Together, the Democratic Coalition and the Budapest branch of the Hungarian Socialist Party.

In September 2017, the MoMa made an electoral coalition with the Democratic Coalition (DK) for the 2018 parliamentary election. In the same time Bokros announced his "500 days programme" which contained the short-lived inevitable cooperation of the "democratic opposition parties" after the victory to "restore democracy" and "break down the Orbán regime". Bokros argued another by-election is required after the successful restoration. In January 2018, Bokros announced the DK has not kept its promise and rejected the agreement; as a result the MoMa aimed to participate in the election individually. DK issued a statement saying, Bokros refused their "fair offer" to provide a single mandate for his party with "not measurable support". While Bokros and some others withdrew their candidacy in favor of the parliamentary opposition, ten candidates of the MoMa ran in the 2018 national election, thus the party was not able to set a national list. They altogether obtained 617 votes.

Lajos Bokros announced the disestablishment of the Modern Hungary Movement on 23 April 2019 with effect from 1 May. He said the delegation members decided to dissolve the party on their last meeting on 15 March. Bokros argued "he main reason for this is that we no longer see the point of serving as a scenario for the weak opposition activity that, under the pressure of arbitrariness, had mostly degenerated into the "Hunger Games".

Election results

For the Hungarian Parliament:

Footnotes

Political parties established in 2013
2013 establishments in Hungary
2019 disestablishments in Hungary
Political parties disestablished in 2019
Conservative parties in Hungary
Liberal conservative parties
Pro-European political parties in Hungary
Defunct political parties in Hungary
European_Conservatives_and_Reformists_member_parties